The Central Intelligence Agency needs to liaise with the United States Armed Forces, and a range of organizational structures have been used since the formation of the CIA to facilitate this liaison.

National Intelligence Support Team 
A NIST normally is composed of personnel from DIA, NSA, NIMA, and the CIA who are deployed upon request by the military commander to facilitate the flow of timely all-source intelligence between a Joint Task Force (JTF) and Washington, DC, during crises or contingency operations.

Bureaucratic structure 
Associate Deputy Director of Operations for Military Affairs (ADDO/MA)

This position 'faded off the org chart' after the creation of the ADCI/MS c. 1995

Associate Director of Central Intelligence for Military Support (ADCI/MS)
or Associate Director of Military Support
or Assistant Director for Military Support

and finally, Associate Director for Military Affairs

This position was created by CIA Director John Deutch in 1995  He called it the 'Associate Director for Military Affairs' in a report in 1996, but that name was not used until the late 1st decade of the 21st century in official documents, like org charts, and the 110th congress DoD appropriations bill says that Title IX Subtitle D will undergo changes "necessitated by the redesignation of the CIA's Assistant Director for Military Support as the Associate Director for Military Affairs."

Office of Military Affairs
1992 - Created by CIA after problems during the Gulf War
1995/1996 - Moved out of the Directorate of Operations by ADCI/MS Dennis C. Blair, to be directly under his office, which reported directly to the Director

OMA is staffed by CIA and military personnel. As the agency's single POC for military support, OMA negotiates, coordinates, manages, and monitors all aspects of agency support for military operations. This support is a continuous process that can be enhanced or modified to respond to a crisis or developing operation. Interaction between OMA and the DCI representatives to the OSD, the Joint Staff, and the combatant commands facilitates the provision of national-level intelligence in support of joint operations, operation planning, and exercises.

List of associate directors for military affairs
1995-1996 Vice Admiral Dennis C. Blair, USN 
1996-1997 Lieutenant General John A. Gordon, USAF 
2000-2003 Lieutenant General John H. Campbell, USAF 
2004-2005 Vice Admiral Albert Calland III, USN 
2006-2008 Major General John T. Brennan, USAF 
2008-2010 Lieutenant General Mark A. Welsh III, USAF 
2010-2013 Lieutenant General Kurt A. Cichowski, USAF

Notes

References 

Central Intelligence Agency
United States Department of Defense